The Madison Symphony Orchestra (MSO) is an orchestra headquartered in Madison, Wisconsin. Its conductor is John DeMain, who began his 28th season with the orchestra in the fall of 2022. The orchestra was founded in 1925 as a small community ensemble and is now a full-sized orchestra.

Overture Hall 
The Madison Symphony performs in Madison's Overture Hall, one of two theaters in Madison's Overture Center for the Arts, a gift given to Madison by longtime M.S.O. patrons Jerome Frautschi and his wife, Pleasant Rowland Frautschi. The Frautschis' gift held the distinction of being one of the largest gifts ever donated to the performing arts by a single donor in American history, actually exceeding the entire budget of the "National Endowment for the Arts". Their gift in turn inspired a wave of gifts to the performing arts nationwide. 

Overture Hall has been described as "one of the acoustically finest halls in America" by guest artists, conductors, and visiting shows alike; and among other notable features the hall possesses the magnificent "Overture Concert Organ", custom built for the Overture Center by renowned organ builder, Johannes Klais of Bonn, Germany. At twenty tons, the Klais organ is the largest movable object in any theater in America, with a capability to move forward and back into storage on a set of railroad tracks. It provides the orchestra with superior augmentation to such works as Richard Strauss' "Also sprach Zarathustra" or Gustav Holst's "The Planets".

References

External links
Madison Symphony Orchestra official site

American orchestras
Musical groups established in 1925
Culture of Madison, Wisconsin
Performing arts in Wisconsin
Musical groups from Wisconsin